Carleton Bartlett Gibson (September 18, 1863 – May 22, 1927) was a 19th– and 20th-century American industrial educator, most notable for having served as the first president of the Rochester Athenæum and Mechanics Institute from 1910 to 1916.

He was born in Mobile, Alabama in the year before the Battle of Mobile Bay.  His father was a Scotsman and his mother was a New Yorker.  As a child, he attended school at the Barton Academy and the Mobile Military Academy.  He graduated from the University of Alabama with bachelor's and master's degrees in the Classics in 1884 and 1885, respectively and married the former Martha "Mattie" Goodwin Newcomb in 1889.  While still in college he became principal of the public school in Mulberry, Alabama.  After graduation, he took a job at the State Normal School at Jacksonville, Alabama and helped establish the University Military School of Alabama in 1892.  He briefly served as president of the Alabama Central Female College in Tuscaloosa in 1893.

Also in 1893, he left to become the principal of the Columbus, Georgia High School and within the year became Superintendent of the Columbus City Schools.  With the financial support of George Foster Peabody, he established the first school for industrial education in the South, the Primary Industrial School of Columbus in 1900.  The school introduced the children of mill workers to two dozen different handicrafts that would prove useful for their later employ in the local textile factories.

Gibson was hired to oversee the Rochester Athenæum and Mechanics Institute in June 1910 by the then board of directors which included George Eastman.  He instituted the Institute's Cooperative education program in 1912, as part of his focus on industrial education.  The program required students to study half time and to work half time in shops at Eastman Kodak, Gleason Works, and the German American Button Company.

Gibson took a leave of absence from the Institute in 1914, joining Herbert Hoover's American Commission for War Relief in Belgium with tours of duty in Belgium, France, and Russian Poland.  He eventually resigned the Institute Presidency to pursue that undertaking full-time in June 1915.  The Institute did not recognize his resignation for a full year while it sought another president.  Upon America's entry into the War, he organized divisional schools for the Army and served as director of Vocational Training for the American Expeditionary Force in France.

After the end of the War, Gibson was elected Superintendent of the Savannah, Georgia public school system.  In 1926, he left education to become a vice president at the Florida Title Insurance Company in Miami.  He died suddenly in Norfolk, Virginia in 1927.

After his death his wife delivered lectures on international affairs before succumbing to pneumonia.

References

External links
RIT Archives' collection on Carleton B. Gibson

1863 births
1927 deaths
American classical scholars
Baptists from Alabama
Jacksonville State University
People from Mobile, Alabama
Presidents of Rochester Institute of Technology
University of Alabama alumni
19th-century Baptists